Vujošević or Vujosevic is a Serbian surname. Notable people with the surname include:

 Bogić Vujošević (born 1992) Serbian–Austrian basketball player
 Duško Vujošević (born 1959), Serbian basketball coach
 Smilja Vujosevic (1935–2016), Canadian chess master
 Suzana Vujošević (born 1990), Serbian–Montenegrin footballer

Serbian surnames
Montenegrin surnames